The St.-Martins-Chorknaben Biberach (English: St Martin's Boys' Choir Biberach) is a boys' and men's choir from Biberach an der Riß in southern Germany. The choir was founded in 1962 and is since then member of the Pueri Cantores, an international association of catholic youth choirs.

The choir regularly takes part in services in its home parish St Martin and the surrounding parishes. In their annual concert tour the choirboys also perform abroad.

Repertoire 

The St.-Martins-Chorknaben sing sacred music – usually a cappella, that is without instrumental sound. Their repertory covers all the periods in musical history – from Gregorian Chant over Bach and Mozart up to modern composers like Poulenc or Miškinis. The choir rehearses twice a week. As the need arises the singers get an extra voice training. Moreover there is a rehearsal weekend twice a year.

Concert tours 

With their annual concert tour the St.-Martins-Chorknaben want to contribute to the understanding among nations. During their journey they try to stay in host families to get to learn the country and its people.
2002 the St.-Martins-Chorknaben stayed on Guernsey. Inhabitants of this Channel Island were interned in Oflag V-B in Biberach during World War II. With their visit the choirboys could contribute to strengthen the partnership between Guernsey and Biberach.

Media 

DVD:

Hinter den Stimmen – Die Chorknaben aus Biberach (English: Behind the Voices – The Choirboys from Biberach)

The documentary had its premiere in November 2009 at the film festival of Biberach. The DVD was released in July 2010.

CD:

Cantate Domino (2009)

References

External links 
 Official website
 Website of the documentary "Behind the Voices – The Choirboys from Biberach"
 Trailer of the documentary on YouTube

Boys' and men's choirs
German choirs
Biberach an der Riss
Musical groups established in 1962
1962 establishments in West Germany